Communio et progressio is a pastoral instruction of the Roman Catholic Church, issued by the  Pontifical Council for Social Communications on 23 May 1971. It was prepared in accordance with the Second Vatican Council’s 1963 decree Inter Mirifica. The Council having abandoned the general use of the nihil obstat and imprimatur to approve publications, and of the index to restrict access to undesirable publications, the new pastoral instruction outlined the relations with public media that Church authorities were henceforth to adopt: recognition of the freedom of information and free choice of information, the legitimate independence of the activity of journalists and media institutions, and the need to educate members of the Church in the discriminating use of media.

References

Clifford Longley, “Journalism”, in The Oxford Companion to Christian Thought, edited by Adrian Hastings, Alistair Mason and Hugh S. Pyper (Oxford University Press, 2000), pp. 353-354.
Michael Schmolke, "Information and the Mass Media", in The Church in the Modern Age, edited by Gabriel Adriányi (London: Burns & Oates, 1981), pp. 433-434.
Paul Soukup, "Vatican Opinion on Modern Communication", in Quoting God: How Media Shape Ideas about Religion and Culture, edited by Claire Badaracco (Waco, Texas: Baylor University Press, 2005), pp. 233-245.
Franz-Josef Eilers (ed.), Kirche und Publizistik: Dreizehn Kommentare z. Pastoralinstruktion Communio et progressio (Munich, Paderborn and Vienna: Schöningh, 1972).

External links

 English text on the website of the Roman Curia. (Accessed 16 January 2015.)

Documents of the Catholic Church
Pontifical Council for Social Communications
1971 documents